Song Xiaoyun, born 11 December 1982 in Anshan, Liaoning) is a Chinese basketball player who was part of the teams that won gold medals at the 2002 and 2006 Asian Games. She was part of the Chinese squad at the 2004 Summer Olympics in Athens, the 2008 Summer Olympics in Beijing, and the 2012 Summer Olympics in London.

References

External links
 

1982 births
Living people
Chinese women's basketball players
Basketball players at the 2004 Summer Olympics
Basketball players at the 2008 Summer Olympics
Basketball players at the 2012 Summer Olympics
Olympic basketball players of China
Sportspeople from Anshan
Basketball players from Liaoning
Asian Games medalists in basketball
Basketball players at the 2002 Asian Games
Basketball players at the 2006 Asian Games
Asian Games gold medalists for China
Medalists at the 2002 Asian Games
Medalists at the 2006 Asian Games
Bayi Kylin players
Guangdong Vermilion Birds players
21st-century Chinese people